Arsa Sarasin (born 26 May 1937) is a Thai diplomat and businessman who served as Principal Private Secretary to King Bhumibol Adulyadej until he retired in 2012.

Early life and education
Arsa Sarasin was the son of former Prime Minister of Thailand Pote Sarasin and his wife, Thanpuying Siri Sarasin. He was one of three brothers, including Pao Sarasin and Pong Sarasin. Arsa Sarasin graduated from Bangkok Christian College, a private boys' school in Bangkok and Dawlish Primary School in London. He then moved to the United States, where he study High school at Wilbraham & Monson Academy and received a bachelor's degree from Boston University.

Careers
From 1977 to 1979, he was firstly appointed as Thailand's ambassador to Belgium. Then, around two to three years later from 1982 to 1985, he was Permanent Secretary of the Ministry of Foreign Affairs and from 1985 to 1988 he was appointed ambassador to the United States.

From 1999 to 2012, he was Principal Private Secretary to King Bhumibol Adulyadej, responsible for aiding the monarch in the exercise of his official duties and relations with the government. He has sat on the boards of the family-owned Thai Pure Drinks Company, as well as the Siam Cement Group, Charoen Pokphand Foods, Dusit International, and Bangkok Dusit Medical Services.

Honours

National honours
 Knight Grand Cordon (Special Class) of the Most Exalted Order of the White Elephant (1984)
 Knight Grand Cordon (Special Class) of the Most Noble Order of the Crown of Thailand (1982)
 Knight Grand Cordon (Second Class, upper grade) of the Most Illustrious Order of Chula Chom Klao (1994)
 Recipient of the Chakrabarti Mala Medal (1985)
 First Class of the Boy Scout Citation Medal of Vajira (2003)

Foreign honours
 Knight Grand Cross of the Order of Orange-Nassau (Netherlands, 2004)

See also
Sarasin family

References

Arsa Sarasin
Arsa Sarasin
Hainanese people
Arsa Sarasin
1937 births
Living people
Arsa Sarasin
Arsa Sarasin
Arsa Sarasin
Arsa Sarasin